Hajjiabad (also Romanized as Ḩājjīābād; also known as Deh Lorī) is a village in Kamfiruz-e Shomali Rural District, Kamfiruz District, Marvdasht County, Fars Province, Iran. At the 2006 census, its population was 1,121, in 197 families.

References 

Populated places in Marvdasht County